Henry Allen (August 11, 1889 – December 21, 1971) was an American equestrian. He competed in the individual jumping event at the 1920 Summer Olympics.  He graduated from the United States Military Academy and Harvard University.

References

External links
 

1889 births
1971 deaths
American male equestrians
Olympic equestrians of the United States
Equestrians at the 1920 Summer Olympics
People from West Point, New York
United States Military Academy alumni
Harvard University alumni